The 1937 Villanova Wildcats football team represented Villanova College during the 1937 college football season. The Wildcats were led by second-year head coach Maurice J. "Clipper" Smith and played their home games at Villanova Stadium in Philadelphia, Pennsylvania. Villanova ended the season undefeated with a record of 8–0–1, allowing only one score all year. They ranked 6th in the final AP Poll, the highest finish in Wildcats team history.

Schedule

References

Villanova
Villanova Wildcats football seasons
College football undefeated seasons
Villanova Wildcats football